Cry Wolf is a novel by Wilbur Smith set during the 1935 Italian invasion of Ethiopia.

Plot 
The plot is set minorly in Dar-es-Salaam and majorly in the Ethiopian desert-lands sometime in the 1930s, just as the Axis powers were starting to pursue their colonial ambitions.

The novel starts off in Dar-es-Salaam in Tanzania. Jake Barton, an engineer from Texas, and Major Gareth Swales, a British hustler, form an uneasy alliance in order to refurbish four armoured cars which Swales is planning to sell to an Ethiopian prince, Lij Mikhael. During their meeting and proposed selling, they meet the American reporter Victoria "Vicky" Campbell and both the men are smitten at once. Later the Lij tells them that he is buying the armoured cars as well the ammunition to fight the Italians, who are planning an invasion of Ethiopia, but owing to an international embargo imposed on Ethiopia, he can not import weapons by himself and consequently asks Swales to smuggle the cars into Ethiopia via French and British Somaliland. He also dispatches the services of his nephew Gregarious to help. Vicky also volunteers to help. The four of them ship the cars in a slave ship, then drive it from the seashore across the desert to the Ethiopian highlands, where they are met by the Ras Gholum and the Ethiopian people.

On the Italian side, Colonel Count Aldo Belli has been ordered the task of securing the Wells of Chaldi, a seemingly barren piece of land where it seems there will be no action taking place, in order to remove him from the more important locations which require more battle-hardened personnel, contrary to the Count who gets the position owing to his proximity to Mussolini. He sets off to the Wells, engaging in all forms of luxury at the cost of time and hardships for his comrades, and with the help of his trusted Major Luigi Castelani, manages to engage the Ethiopians in an ambush, and inflates the amount of losses caused by him and his men.

The Lij then requests Barton and Swales to stay and help the Ethiopians, in the process enlisting the help of another Ras. Unknowing to him, this Ras has betrayed him to the Italians. After a whirlwind of events, Vicky starts falling in love with Jake. The Italians, on the other hand, start their invasion plans.

At the end, with all the best efforts of the Ethiopians, the Italians break down their defences and reach the town of Sardi, which had been the rally point for the protagonists. With nowhere to go, Vicky, Sara, Gregarious and Jake get into the plane, with a severely injured Gareth who was shot by the invading Italian forces.

References

External links
Review at Publishers Weekly

Novels by Wilbur Smith
1976 British novels
Fiction set in 1935
Novels set in Ethiopia
Heinemann (publisher) books